Blackhouse Records is an American independent record label founded by Scott Rozell (drummer for Moral Crux and Scatterbox), and Tony Shields. The label is based in Coeur d'Alene, Idaho and was originally a logo created in 2000 for the purpose of selling Scatterbox records and promoting local Inland Northwest punk rock concerts Over the years, it has evolved into a moderate-sized independent record label. Throughout the 2000's, most of the bands on Blackhouse were punk and pop punk groups, while there are many heavy metal and rap acts signed to the label as well. Blackhouse started a short-lived imprint, "Totally Fucked", which signed noise and grindcore bands, however they all now roll up under the Blackhouse imprint.

History

Early years
Scott Rozell and Tony Shields formed Blackhouse Records in July 2000 as a vehicle for releases by the band Scatterbox, a band featuring brothers Tom and Ryan white as well as Rozell. It soon became a platform for the releases of various local and regional Northwest artists.

In 2008, Blackhouse re-issued a (at the time out-of-print) spoken word release The Birth of Tragedy Magazine's FEAR POWER GOD, originally released by CFY Records (a Bay Area record label run by Oxbow frontman, Eugene S. Robinson) in the 1980s on CD format. Before this release, the compilation had never been released on the compact disc format. The album featured spoken word pieces by Henry Rollins, Charles Manson, Anton LaVey, Lydia Lunch, Allen Ginsberg, and Jello Biafra. The album was well-received, gaining the label more attention in the press and distribution world, landing them an exclusive distribution deal with the now-defunct Lumberjack/Mordam Records, a subsidiary of the Warner Music Group. The relationship was short lived due to financial woes with Lumberjack/Mordam, which caused the company to close operations.

Change in style
In 2013, the label started to stray from its traditional punk rock genre by signing metal and hip-hop acts such as Slug Christ, The Drip, The Colourflies, Rot Monger, Zan, Lord Narf, Ras Kass, Coodie Breeze, Absurdist, Prison Religion, Cold Blooded, and Nobodies.

Blackhouse went into a non-exclusive manufacturing and distribution agreement with rapper Father and his imprint, Awful Records in 2016, with the label releasing Who's Gonna Get F***ed First? and Young Hot Ebony in early 2017. This was the first time either album had been released on physical format.

In 2017 through 2018, the label was very prolific, teaming up with Nashville, Tennessee underground cassette label Candy Drips on numerous releases, shirt collaboration projects with well known blog and label DatPizz, and releasing a variety of albums ranging from hip-hop, trap, grindcore, hardcore punk, experimental and metal. The label hosted a full label showcase at the kickoff night of Northwest weekly the Inlander magazine's Volume Music Festival in 2017 with virtually all active artists on the label under one roof performing that evening.

2019 saw a return to more metal and punk-based genre releases with new additions from The Accüsed, Narrow Minded, The Drip, ZAN, Sterileprayer, Oxbow front man Eugene S. Robinson & French experimental noise artist Philippe Petit, and an archival release of lost music from David Koresh.  In 2019, the label also entered into a distribution partnership with Southern Records/SRD to cover European and Asia territories.

Roster

 A Hollywood Legend
 Accused AD / Toe Tag (American band)
 AJ Suede
 Absurdist
 AraPacis
 Astral Bodiez
 Bird Fight
 Blacktracks
 Call Me Renegade
 Cold Blooded (Now known as Throneburner)
 Colourflies
 Coodie Breeze and Tyler Major
 Dead Country
 The Drip
 Eugene S. Robinson and Philippe Petit
 Execution Techniques
 Father (Manufacturing/Distribution Only)
 FAUS
 Fetish
 Filthy White Trash

 Gadgetor
 Honey Badger
 Infrablaster
 Jamo Gang
 Johnny J & The Flat Foot Floogies
 Jordan Isaiah
 Lil Percy
 Lord Narf
 Moral Crux
 Narrow Minded
 Nobodies
 Phantom Limb Management (US Distribution Only)
 Prison Religion
 Ras Kass
 Rot Monger
 Rozz Dyliams
 Sadie Hawkins Rejects
 Scatterbox
 SEAN
 Seizure
 Slug Christ
 Snakes/Sermons
 Sterileprayer
 Sugar Skulls
 Thoed Myndez
 Virginia Slim
 Zan
 Zepar (band)|Zepar

See also 
 List of record labels

References

External links
 

Record labels established in 2001
2001 establishments in Idaho
American independent record labels
Punk record labels
Hardcore record labels
Alternative rock record labels
Heavy metal record labels